Somdet Phra Sangharaja Chao Krommaluang Vajirañāṇasaṃvara (3 October 1913 – 24 October 2013), né Charoen Khachawat and dharma name Suvaḍḍhano, was the 19th Supreme Patriarch of Thailand. He was appointed to the position in 1989 by King Bhumibol Adulyadej. He turned 100 in October 2013, and died later the same month.

Early life 
Somdet Phra Nyanasamvara, the 19th monk since the reign of Rama I to hold the title of Supreme Buddhist Patriarch (Sangharaja) of Thailand, was born on 3 October 1913 in Kanchanaburi Province, Thailand (at about 4 a.m., in the modern calendar, 4 October). As a child he was interested in religion and monastic life; it is said that, as a child, he liked dressing up like a monk, and giving 'sermons' to his friends and family. He completed the equivalent of the 5th grade at a temple school near his home, and was then ordained as a Buddhist novice (samanera) at the age of 14.

Instruction in Pali and other fundamentals of Buddhist education were not readily available in his home province (a common problem in Thailand during the early 20th century), so Somdet Nyanasamvara traveled to a temple at Nakhon Pathom, 70 km away, where he spent two years studying Pali and Buddhist philosophy. He then moved to Wat Bovoranives in Bangkok, an important temple in the emergent Dhammayutt Order (Thai: Thammayuttika) reform movement, where he completed his basic studies and completed the highest level of Pali studies then available.

In 1933, Somdet Nyanasamvara returned to his old temple in Kanchanaburi to be ordained as a full-fledged monk (bhikkhu). After passing the better part of a year there, he again traveled to Wat Bovoranives, where he was re-ordained into the Dhammayutt Order, under the supervision of the 13th Thai Supreme Patriarch. During this period in Thailand, it was not uncommon for monks to seek re-ordination under the Dhammayutt Order if their initial ordination had been through a Mahanikaya lineage; the Dhammayutt Order was considered by many to be more careful in its observance of disciplinary rules, and enjoyed great support from the Thai monarchy.

Rise through the ranks 

Following his full ordination, Somdet Nyanasamvara rose quickly through the ranks of the Thai Sangha.  As Thai ecclesiastic titles often take the form of additions or alterations to monastic names, this necessitated a variety of changes of name and title during the next several years. In 1956, at the age of 43 and under the titular name Phra Dhammavarabhorn, he was appointed guardian and advisor to King Rama IX (Bhumibol Adulyadej) during his royal ordination (by tradition, all Thai monarchs serve as Buddhist monks prior to gaining the throne). Five years later, Somdet Nyanasamvara was named abbot of Wat Bovoranives.

In 1972, he was given the title Somdet Phra Nyanasamvara, the same basic title that he bears today. This was a special monastic title that had not been granted to a Thai bhikkhu in over 150 years.  The granting of this title placed Somdet Phra Nyanasamvara in the top tier of the Thai monastic establishment, and set the stage for his being named Supreme Buddhist Patriarch of Thailand (Sangharaja, or "Lord of the Sangha") in 1989 by the king of Thailand.

Achievements and challenges 
 
During his more than seventy years as a monk and novice, Somdet Nyanasamvara has held a variety of posts in the Thai ecclesiastic hierarchy.  In these roles, he has always been concerned with promoting education, both religious and secular.  He has assisted in the founding and construction of numerous schools, as well as sponsoring campaigns to build schools, temples, and hospitals in rural communities.

As abbot of Wat Bovoranives, he oversaw the renovation and expansion of this famed century-old monastery.  Long interested in the meditation techniques of the Thai forest monks, Somdet Nyanasamvara has helped make his temple residence a center for meditation study and instruction in Bangkok, himself delivering lectures on meditation and Buddhist teachings on two Uposatha days each month.

Somdet Nyanasamvara has also been active in teaching to both non-Thais and the international Thai emigrant community.  His recorded sermons and teachings are distributed among Thais living outside Thailand, particularly in areas where there is not access to temples or Theravada monks.  Non-Thais have also been encouraged to study Buddhism; Wat Bovoranives is known as one of several monasteries in Thailand where Westerners can not only study, but also ordain either as full bhikkhu, or for a limited term (such as vassa) as a novice (samanera).  A number of Somdet Nyanasamvara's books and talks have also been translated into English, and he has been involved in sponsoring the establishment of temples and monasteries outside Thailand.

Somdet Phra Nyanasamvara's tenure has probably been exposed to more criticism and controversy than that of any preceding Thai Sangharaja.  A number of Thai monks – among them some prominent and popular religious leaders – became embroiled in scandal, with allegations ranging from sexual misconduct to corrupt fundraising schemes and involvement in organized crime. Changes in Thai society wrought by modernization began to impose on the traditional and conservative Sangha as well – including calls for greater rolls for laypeople and younger monks in religious affairs, and organized efforts both in Thailand and abroad to re-create the lost Theravada bhikkhuni (nun-priest) ordination.

Because of the convoluted governing structure of the Thai Sangha (which includes both ecclesiastic and civil officials) and the Patriarch's health problems, it is difficult to determine what, if any, role that Somdet Nyanasamvara has played in formulating a response to these challenges.  Certainly, the course held by the Council of Elders has not strayed during his tenure; they continue to defrock those monks found guilty of the most flagrant offenses, and to strongly oppose any change in the official status of women in the Sangha.  The Council (and, by implication, Somdet Nyanasamvara) have received criticism for not taking a more proactive role in reforming disciplinary standards and eliminating corruption.

Like its predecessors, the Council of Elders under Somdet Nyanasamvara has been very conservative and reluctant to act without great deliberation.  There are some indications that this may be the best course for maintaining the confidence of the lay public; in the United States, for instance, some temples that have attempted to change the roles of Theravada monks have been met by a strong backlash from their lay communities.  However, the troubles of the Catholic Church in the United States have offered a model of the possible consequences of failing to deal openly and swiftly with corruption and misconduct: an eventual meltdown, made worse by stop-gap attempts to preserve the people's faith in religious institutions, rather than dealing openly with problems.

Furthermore, educated Buddhist women and their supporters – Thais, Westerners, and others – continue to call for an expanded role for female Buddhists, with many calling for a rebirth of the Theravada bhikkhuni lineage.   They are joined in this call not only by some laymen, but by an increasing number of progressive monks.  Some supporters of the recreation of the bhikkhuni lineage have already begun to take action, ordaining Buddhist nuns through recourse to the existing Chinese bhikkhuni lineage.  The Council and secular authorities have condemned these actions, going so far as to arrest for impersonation of a member of the clergy at least one Thai woman who underwent the new bhikkhuni ordination (ordained bhikkhu have a different civil status in Thai society than non-ordained female followers, such as the mae jis).

The actions of Somdet Nyanasamvara and his Council (or, more likely, his successor and his Council) during the next few years may have a lasting impact on the Thai Sangha – either by beginning to resolve the troublesome questions that have arisen during the last half of the 20th century, or by deepening what could prove to be a pending crisis for Theravada as a whole.

Later life 

By the late 1990s, the Patriarch's health was in serious decline.  In early 1999, he stopped attending meetings of the Sangha Council.  His attendant and advisors and the other members of the council increasingly managed the day-to-day workings of the Thai Sangha without direct leadership from Somdet Nyanasamvara.  By 2003, it was clear that the 90-year-old Sangharaja was unable to effectively fill the position to which he had been appointed.   The government felt obliged to act, and appointed a committee of senior monks (selected by monastic rank, not age) to act on behalf of the Sangharaja.  The move received widespread support; a poll conducted among Thai monks found that more than 70% supported the appointment of a representative for the Supreme Patriarch.  Given the challenges facing the Thai Sangha, the appointment of the representative council seemed like an excellent move.  Since the committee had the power to act on behalf of the patriarch, they had the opportunity to take up issues that may have been neglected during the absence of the Sangha Council's senior-most member.

However, the appointment of a committee to represent the Supreme Patriarch was not without some controversy.   Monks close to Somdet Nyanasamvara's camp protested the move as a violation of Thailand's Sangha Act.  Government officials countered that these individuals, fearing a loss of prestige or influence if the aging Patriarch was circumvented, were putting their own interests ahead of those of the Sangha.  The controversy was further convoluted by lingering debates over the appointment of a second Sangharaja – one for the Dhammayutt Order, and one for the Mahanikaya Order.  Some saw the appointment of the committee as an attempt to surreptitiously pave the way for a second patriarch, suspicions the government was quick to dismiss.

The Supreme Patriarch allowed materials from his temple, such as ash from incense and powder from bricks, to be made into controversial Jatukham Rammathep amulets.  The popularity of the amulets, which are believed by some to have magical powers and cost up to 600,000 baht each, was such that in April 2007, a woman was crushed to death when thousands of people rushed into a school in Nakhon Si Thammarat to buy coupons they could exchange for the amulets. A few weeks after the death, the Supreme Patriarch stopped providing materials for the amulets.

In early 2004, Nyanasamvara was admitted to Chulalongkorn Hospital in Bangkok.  He has continued to reside at the hospital since then, making only 2 public appearances outside the hospital- the latest in October 2005 to bestow blessings at a ceremony marking his 92nd birthday.  By 2005, concerns about the role that the representative council would take were increasingly eclipsed by debate over succession.  With the Patriarch's health continuing to decline, focus increasingly turned to Somdet Kiaw (known formally as Somdet Phutthacharn), abbot of Wat Saket.  By the terms of Thailand's religious law – modified in 1991 to take the choice of the patriarch away from the king – Somdet Kiaw would become the next Sangharaja automatically.  This development was vocally opposed by Phra Maha Bua, a popular monk often believed to be an enlightened arhat.  Phra Maha Bua's supporters claimed that Somdet Kiaw earned his high position in the Sangha hierarchy through corruption and abuse of power, and that he deserved to be defrocked rather than promoted.  The controversy gained national prominence when Sondhi Limthongkul and his People's Alliance for Democracy used it to criticize the Thaksin Shinawatra government.

The rancorous succession debate has brought to the forefront long-standing complaints against the amended 1962 Sangha Act (sometimes called the Ecclesiastic Bill) that defines the structure and governance of the Thai Sangha.   Created during a period of military dictatorship, the 1962 Sangha Act stripped out democratic reforms that had accompanied King Mongkut's doctrinal and disciplinary reforms.  The act lent greater power to the roll of the Sangharaja, and structured the Sangha along according to a strict hierarchy that stifled dissent and provided few significant roles for younger monks. Thus, while Somdet Nyanasamvara's health has prevented him from taking an active role in reforming the Thai Sangha during the past several years, his death may prompt the biggest reform of all: the creation of a new Sangha Act that will define a more democratic leadership structure for Thailand's largest religious organization.

References

External links
English web-page of Birth and Early Life
Entry on Somdet Phra Nyanasamvara Suvaddhana Mahathera at Everything2
An extensive biography of Somdet Phra Nyanasamvara, including details about his various posts and titles.
A smaller bio, containing a much more streamlined overview.
English website of the Supreme Patriarch

1913 births
2013 deaths
Thai centenarians
Thai Theravada Buddhist monks
Supreme Patriarchs of Thailand
People from Kanchanaburi province
Men centenarians